Salim Ben Ali Al-Qasimi served as Prime Minister of Comoros under President Ahmed Abdallah from December 22, 1978 until February 8, 1982.

References

1918 births
2002 deaths
Prime Ministers of the Comoros